Michael Goldstein may refer to:
 Mikhail Goldstein (1917–1989), composer and violinist
 Michael Goldstein (1938–2018), founder of the SoHo Weekly News